On 20 May 2004, a car bomb detonated in Acıbadem, Turkey, in the car park of a McDonald's restaurant. No casualties were reported and numerous parked cars were seriously damaged by the explosion. The police, who was informed about a bomb 15 minutes before the attack, evacuated the restaurant and took intense security measures, preventing the loss of life.

8 people with connections to the attack were arrested in the week after the attack. After judicial process, it was revealed that they were TİKKO members. It was determined that the individuals were involved in the bombing, as well as an incident that resulted in the killing of 2 soldiers in Tokat.

References 

Maoism in Turkey
Terrorism in Turkey
Terrorism in 2004